John Morris Scientific is an Australian firm engaged in the distribution, installation & servicing of laboratory, Environmental, Petrochemical, Vacuum and Industrial instrumentation & consumables to aid researchers and engineers in diverse industry sectors throughout Australia, New Zealand & the South West Pacific region. Their represented brands include famous scientific manufacturers and suppliers such as Cole-Parmer, Advanced Instruments, Gilson, PAC, Stanhope Seta, Isco, Sigma, Masterflex, PCB Piezotronics and MTS.
 
The John Morris Group principally serves the life sciences, vacuum research, environmental, petroleum, industrial and pharmaceutical industries.

History
With original roots in Holland for two generations - John Morris Scientific was founded in April 1956 by John Leon Wyzenbeek and Morris Garlick to supply Australian research laboratories with quality products not available in the region. The original roots stem back to John's wife Hetty. Her father owned and ran a second generation, chemical and glassware distributor in Holland which was forced into closure during the second world war. The shell of this company was sold after the war and the proceeds were used to establish new roots in Australia.

After working for a range of established Australian Scientific Instrument distributors including Townsend Mercer John Leon Wyzenbeek began a partnership with Morris Garlic leveraging the relationships from Hetty's childhood.

Since inception, three generations of the Wyzenbeek family have worked in John Morris Scientific. At present, John's son Norbert is Chairman of the Board and Norbert's eldest son Andre is the Managing Director.
 
In the early days, John would ride a bicycle to customers selling glassware until he had enough orders to place a shipment with his European suppliers. In 1987 John Morris transitioned from Glassware and Chemicals into instrumentation – investing in product specialist staff and service infrastructure. John Morris Scientific maintains knowledge of the latest technologies by providing personnel with regular factory training, attending vendors’ facilities regularly and through involvement in key industry events.

This company is the only third generation, privately owned, scientific instrument supplier in the South West Pacific region. John Morris Scientific has remained under the same family ownership for over 60 years.

In 2016 John Morris Scientific changed its name to the John Morris Group to better reflect their growth and diversification into technical industries outside of the Laboratory.

Service and training
Their technical services team is composed of 5 graduate application engineers, 15 product specialists and 15 technical engineers. These staff are regularly factory trained on specific instrumentation ensuring that their knowledge remains current. The John Morris Group team share expertise through user training (with installation) and ongoing support specific to application requirements.

References

External links
John Morris Scientific official website

Australian companies established in 1956
Technology companies of Australia
Companies based in Sydney
Technology companies of New Zealand
Research support companies